The Goll Homestead is a historic farm complex in far western Fulton County, Ohio, United States.  Located in German Township northwest of Archbold, the farm has been declared a historic site because of its role in the region's settlement.

House
Before white settlement, Fulton County was a very heavily wooded region. Although most early settlers in this Black Swamp county cleared their lands, Peter Goll, Sr. and his wife Catherine preserved significant areas of virgin woodlands on their property. As Peter Goll, Jr. grew to adulthood, he married and established a new farmstead; building a new house, he used a distinctively European method of massive timber construction derived from the vernacular architecture of the region's earliest French and German settlers. In 1862, one day before their child was born, Peter, Jr. and his wife moved into the new white wooden house. Soon afterward, his parents also moved into the house; in order to accommodate both households, the structure was built divided into two parts, each accessible by a different front door.

Barn
Three years after the house was completed, the Golls erected a barn to shelter their different types of livestock: horses, dairy cows, and possibly pigs.  Like the house, the barn employed distinctive construction methods; its structure was based on wooden mortise and tenon construction, with the massive beams being made from oak trees cut on the property.  In later years, the barn was modified several times; one of these renovations involved the raising of the entire structure by one story to simplify the keeping of livestock.

Public ownership
The house and related buildings remained in the Goll family for a full century.  By the 1960s, ownership had passed to a descendant named Florence Louys, who decided to sell the farmstead and woods to the Ohio Department of Natural Resources (ODNR), which converted it into parkland, the Goll Woods State Nature Preserve.  After the state took control of the property, the house and barn were converted for park purposes; the barn was used for storage, and park rangers lived in the house.  By the 1990s, ODNR had decided to cease using the house for residential purposes, and the decision was made in the early 2000s to demolish both buildings.  Some local residents reacted strongly against this proposal; by working with ODNR and the Ohio General Assembly, they were able to secure grants from the state for the property's restoration, and renovation efforts began in both the barn and the house.

It qualified for inclusion both because of its place in local history and because of its well-preserved historic architecture: it was a survivor of the county's early period of settlement, and its buildings employed elements of distinctively European architecture, such as construction with large timbers. Since that time, restoration efforts have continued — volunteer members of the nonprofit Friends of Goll Homestead have repaired the buildings and returned them to a condition more closely resembling the days of Peter Goll, Jr., while teams from Eastern Michigan University have aided in removing modifications to the house in hopes of converting it into a base from which to conduct experiments in the surrounding woodland.

References

Houses completed in 1862
Houses in Fulton County, Ohio
National Register of Historic Places in Fulton County, Ohio
Houses on the National Register of Historic Places in Ohio
Nature reserves in Ohio
Vernacular architecture in Ohio
1862 establishments in Ohio
Farms on the National Register of Historic Places in Ohio